Philip II (237 – 249), also known as Philip the Younger, was the son and heir of the Roman emperor Philip the Arab by his wife Marcia Otacilia Severa.

Life

When his father became emperor in 244, the 7-year-old Philip was appointed caesar. In 247 he became consul, and was later elevated by his father to the rank of augustus and co-ruler.
The thousandth anniversary of the founding of Rome occurred during their reign and great games and spectacles were planned for the celebration.

Ancient historians say that Philip the Arab and Philip II were both killed in battle by Decius in 249. Modern historians say that when news of Philip the Arab's death reached Rome, Philip II was murdered by the Praetorian Guard at the age of twelve. Some argue that Philip II was sole ruler of the empire for the fall of 249.

References

External links

 roman-emperors.org
 ettuantiquities.com

238 births
249 deaths
Ancient child monarchs
Ancient Roman murder victims
Imperial Roman consuls
3rd-century Roman emperors
Philippus Severus, Marcus
Philip the Arab
3rd-century murdered monarchs
Arabs in the Roman Empire
3rd-century Arabs
Roman emperors murdered by the Praetorian Guard
Sons of Roman emperors

Monarchs who died as children